Naked Lunch is a 1991 surrealist science fiction drama film written and directed by David Cronenberg and starring Peter Weller, Judy Davis, Ian Holm, and Roy Scheider. It is an adaptation of William S. Burroughs' 1959 novel of the same name, and an international co-production of Canada, Britain, and Japan.

The film was released on 27 December 1991 in the United States by 20th Century Fox, and 24 April 1992 in the United Kingdom by First Independent Films. It received positive reviews from critics, but was a box office flop, garnering only $2.6 million out of a $17–18 million budget due to a limited release. It won numerous honours, including the National Society of Film Critics Award for Best Director and seven Genie Awards, notably Best Motion Picture. Naked Lunch has since become a cult film, acclaimed for its surrealistic visual and thematic elements.

Plot
In 1953, Exterminator William Lee finds that his wife Joan is stealing his supply of insecticide to use as a recreational drug. Lee is arrested by the police, and he begins hallucinating due to being exposed to the insecticide. Lee comes to believe that he is a secret agent, and his boss, a giant talking beetle, assigns him the mission of killing Joan, who is allegedly an agent of an organization called Interzone Incorporated. Lee dismisses the beetle's instructions and kills it. Lee returns home to find Joan having sex with Hank, one of his writer friends. Shortly afterwards, he accidentally kills her while attempting to shoot a drinking glass off her head to emulate William Tell.

Having inadvertently accomplished his mission, Lee flees to Interzone, located in a city somewhere in North Africa. He spends his time writing reports concerning his mission; these documents, at the insistence of his visiting literary colleagues, are eventually compiled into the titular book. While Lee is addicted to assorted mind-altering substances, his replacement typewriter, a Clark Nova, becomes a talking insect which tells him to find Dr. Benway by seducing Joan Frost, a doppelgänger of his dead wife. There is a row at gunpoint with Joan's husband Tom, after Lee steals his typewriter, which is then destroyed by the Clark Nova insect. Lee also encounters Yves Cloquet, who is apparently an attractive young gay Swiss gentleman. However, Lee later discovers that Yves is merely disguised as a human, and that his true form is a huge monstrous shapeshifting centipede.

After concluding that Dr. Benway is actually secretly masterminding a narcotics operation for a drug called "black meat" which is supposedly derived from the guts of giant Brazilian centipedes, Lee encounters Tom's housekeeper Fadela, previously observed to be an agent of the narcotics operation. Fadela reveals herself as Dr. Benway in disguise. After being recruited as a double agent for the black meat operation, Lee completes his report and flees Interzone to Annexia with Joan Frost. Stopped by the Annexian border patrol and instructed to prove that he is a writer as he claims, Lee produces a pen. When this proves insufficient for passage, Lee, now having realized that accidentally murdering his wife has driven him to become a writer, demonstrates his William Tell routine using a glass atop Joan Frost's head. He again misses, and thus re-enacts the earlier killing of his wife. The border guards cheerfully bid him welcome to Annexia, and his new life as a writer. Lee is shown shedding a tear at this bittersweet accomplishment.

Cast

Production

Development

The screenplay for Naked Lunch is based not only on Burroughs' novel, but also on other fiction by him, and autobiographical accounts of his life. Cronenberg said it was necessary to "Throw the book away" as a direct adaptation would have been far too expensive and "would be banned in every country in the world."

The shooting of Joan Lee is based on the 1951 death of Joan Vollmer, Burroughs' common-law wife. Burroughs shot and killed Vollmer in a drunken game of "William Tell" at a party in Mexico City. He would later flee to the United States. Burroughs was convicted in absentia of homicide and sentenced to two years, which were suspended. Burroughs stated in the introduction to his book Queer that Joan's death was the starting point of his literary career, saying: "I am forced to the appalling conclusion that I would have never become a writer but for Joan's death".

Music
The film score is composed by Cronenberg's staple composer, Howard Shore, and features free jazz musician Ornette Coleman. The music of the Master Musicians of Jajouka led by Bachir Attar is also featured throughout the film. The use of Coleman's composition "Midnight Sunrise", recorded for his Dancing in Your Head album, is relevant, as author William S. Burroughs was present during the 1973 recording session.

Release

Box office
Naked Lunch was released on 27 December 1991 in a limited release of 5 theaters, grossing $64,491 on its opening weekend. It went on to make $2,641,357 in North America.

Critical reception
On Rotten Tomatoes the film has a 70% rating based on 37 reviews, with an average rating of 7/10. The consensus reads, "Strange, maddening, and at times incomprehensible, Naked Lunch is nonetheless an engrossing experience." On Metacritic, it has a weighted average score of 67 out of 100 based on reviews from 16 critics, indicating "generally favorable reviews".

Roger Ebert gave the film two-and-a-half stars out of four and wrote, "While I admired it in an abstract way, I felt repelled by the material on a visceral level. There is so much dryness, death and despair here, in a life spinning itself out with no joy". Janet Maslin of The New York Times wrote, "for the most part this is a coolly riveting film and even a darkly entertaining one, at least for audiences with steel nerves, a predisposition toward Mr. Burroughs and a willingness to meet Mr. Cronenberg halfway", but did praise Weller's performance: "The gaunt, unsmiling Mr. Weller looks exactly right and brings a perfect offhandedness to his disarming dialogue". Richard Corliss of Time gave a mixed review, calling it "way too colorful - cute, in a repulsive way, with its crawly special effects - and tame compared with its source." In his review for the Washington Post, Desson Howe criticized what he felt to be a "lack of conviction".

Newsweeks David Ansen wrote, "Obviously this is not everybody's cup of weird tea: you must have a taste for the esthetics of disgust. For those up to the dare, it's one clammily compelling movie". Entertainment Weekly gave the film a "B+" rating with Owen Gleiberman praising Weller's performance: "Peter Weller, the poker-faced star of RoboCop, greets all of the hallucinogenic weirdness with a doleful, matter-of-fact deadpan that grows more likable as the movie goes on. The actor's steely robostare has never been more compelling. By the end, he has turned Burroughs' stone-cold protagonist – a man with no feelings – into a mordantly touching hero".

In his review for The Village Voice, J. Hoberman wrote, "Cronenberg has done a remarkable thing. He hasn't just created a mainstream Burroughs on something approximating Burroughs's terms, he's made a portrait of an American writer". Jonathan Rosenbaum in his review for the Chicago Reader wrote, "David Cronenberg's highly transgressive and subjective film adaptation of Naked Lunch ... may well be the most troubling and ravishing head movie since Eraserhead. It is also fundamentally a film about writing – even the film about writing".

Burroughs scholar Timothy S. Murphy found the film to be a muddled adaptation that reflects Cronenberg's mind more than the novel: he feels that Burroughs' subversive, allegorically political depiction of drugs and homosexuality becomes merely aesthetic. Murphy argues that Burroughs' social and politically situated literary techniques become in the film merely the hallucination of a junkie, and that by using the life of Burroughs himself as a framing narrative, Cronenberg turns a fragmented, unromantic, bitterly critical and satirical novel into a conventional bildungsroman.

The film has been selected for a Criterion Collection release, an organization that releases high quality Blu-rays and DVDs for important classic and contemporary films.

Accolades
At the 13th Genie Awards, Naked Lunch received 11 nominations and was perceived as being in an unusually tight competition with Jean-Claude Lauzon's Léolo. The film also competed for the Golden Bear at the Berlin Film Festival.

Legacy
In 1994, Bomb the Bass released the single "Bug Powder Dust" which opens with the quote "I think it's time to discuss your, uh, philosophy of drug use as it relates to artistic endeavour" and closes with the quote "I think it's time for you boys to share my last taste of the true black meat: the flesh of the giant aquatic Brazilian centipede." The song also includes various other quotes, items and themes from the film woven into the lyrics.

In a 1996 episode of The Simpsons, "Bart on the Road", Bart, Nelson, and Milhouse use Bart's fake driver's license to get into the theatre to see an adult film. The film they choose, based on its title and R rating, is Naked Lunch. When they silently exit the theatre, Nelson looks up to the marquee and says, "I can think of at least two things wrong with that title."

See also
 List of films featuring hallucinogens

References

External links
 
 
 Naked Lunch: Burroughs an essay by Gary Indiana at the Criterion Collection

William S. Burroughs
1991 films
1990s science fiction drama films
1991 LGBT-related films
British avant-garde and experimental films
British science fiction drama films
British LGBT-related films
Canadian avant-garde and experimental films
Canadian science fiction drama films
Bisexuality-related films
Canadian LGBT-related films
English-language Canadian films
English-language Japanese films
1990s English-language films
Films directed by David Cronenberg
Films about drugs
Films about the Beat Generation
Films about writers
Puppet films
Male bisexuality in film
Films set in 1953
Films set in Tangier
Films set in New York City
Films shot in Toronto
Best Picture Genie and Canadian Screen Award winners
LGBT-related science fiction drama films
20th Century Fox films
Films scored by Howard Shore
Films produced by Jeremy Thomas
Films based on American novels
1990s avant-garde and experimental films
Uxoricide in fiction
1990s Canadian films
1990s British films